"Bad Blood" is a popular song written by Neil Sedaka and Phil Cody. The song, with uncredited backing vocals by Elton John, reached number one on the Billboard Hot 100 in 1975, remaining in the top position for three weeks. It was certified Gold by the RIAA and was the most successful individual commercial release in Sedaka's career. "Bad Blood" was replaced at the number 1 spot by John's single "Island Girl".

Personnel
Neil Sedaka – vocals, acoustic piano 
Elton John – background vocals (uncredited)
Dean Parks, Steve Cropper – guitar
David Foster – keyboards
Chuck Findley, Dick Hyde, Jackie Kelso, Jim Horn – woodwinds
Nigel Olsson – drums
Leland Sklar – bass guitar
Milt Holland – percussion

Chart performance

Weekly charts

Year-end charts

References

External links
[ All Music review of the song]
 

1975 songs
1975 singles
Neil Sedaka songs
Elton John songs
Billboard Hot 100 number-one singles
Cashbox number-one singles
RPM Top Singles number-one singles
Songs written by Neil Sedaka
Songs with lyrics by Phil Cody
The Rocket Record Company singles
Polydor Records singles